L.D. Miller Funeral Home, commonly known as the Miller Funeral Home, is a historic building at 507 South Main Avenue in Sioux Falls, South Dakota. It was listed on the National Register of Historic Places in 1983.

History
In either 1902 or 1903, Lee D. Miller established his funeral home and a livery barn on South Main Avenue in Sioux Falls. In 1923, Miller hired local architectural firm Perkins & McWayne to build a new, larger facility on the property, as Miller had just incorporated two other local funeral homes—Burnside Funeral Home and Joseph Nelson Funeral Home—into his. Miller's wife was the first woman embalmer to be licensed in the state of South Dakota and worked with him at the funeral home. On August 18, 1983, it was added to the National Register of Historic Places for its architectural significance and contributions to Sioux Falls' economy.

Architecture
Perkins & McWayne designed the building in the Mission Revival architectural style. Its exterior is encased in white stucco laid over masonry. There are numerous Spanish Colonial Revival decorative elements, including a frieze consisting of a painted belt and rectangular accents between the brackets that support its red ceramic tile mansard roof. Red awnings shelter the building's street-facing arched doorways. The windows on the first floor are arched, while the second-floor windows are rectangular. A large chimney sits at the rear of the building. Inside, the service chapel contains a stained glass skylight.

References

External links
 

National Register of Historic Places in Sioux Falls, South Dakota
Commercial buildings completed in 1923
Commercial buildings on the National Register of Historic Places in South Dakota
Death care companies of the United States
Spanish Colonial Revival architecture in the United States
1923 establishments in South Dakota
Mission Revival architecture in South Dakota